Alex Konadu (1948 – 18 January 2011) was a Ghanaian singer-songwriter and guitarist who was known for his contribution to the Highlife tradition. Konadu sang in the Asante language Twi. He was nicknamed "One Man Thousand" for his ability to draw crowds wherever he appeared, and it is rumored that he performed in every single town and village in Ghana. Konadu's song "Asaase Asa," from the 1976 album by the same name, details a tragedy that befalls a man, killing his wife and sister. The song is dedicated to all those that have lost loved ones, and consequently, it is a "must-play at any Ghanaian funeral".

Biography
Konadu was born in Adwumakase Kese in the Kwabere No. 3 District of Ashanti in 1948. He was part of the Kantamanto Bosco Group, the Kwabena Akwaboah and then the Happy Brothers Band before he became a solo artist. After watching him rehearse, record producer A. K. Brobbey signed him and organized a band that focused on uptempo Highlife guitar music.

Konadu died in Kumasi on 18 January 2011 at the age of 63.

Discography
Albums

Contributing artist
 The Rough Guide to Highlife (2003, World Music Network)

References

Ashanti people
Ghanaian musicians
1950 births
2011 deaths